The Belgian men's 4 × 400 metres relay team, nicknamed the Belgian Tornados from July 2014 onwards, is the relay team of the Belgian national athletics team that has given the highest number of medals in the international competitions, mainly thanks to the support of the Borlée family.

History
The Belgian men's 4 × 400 meters relay team has won 15 medals at the international athletics competitions, five World Championships and eight (five gold) at the European Championships. Of these medals seven were won in outdoor competitions (three gold) and six in indoor competitions (two gold).

At the Olympic Games the team's best result was 4th place twice.

Borlée family

The progenitor of the Borlee family is Jacques (born 1957), bronze medalist at the 1983 European Indoor Championships in Budapest on 200 m, while his first wife  (born 1964) was a good sprinter with a personal best of 23.89. Six of his seven children are athletes (the first five born from the first marriage with Edith, the last two born from a second marriage, but now only Rayane (born 1999) is an athlete).

The eldest daughter Olivia (born 1986) won the silver medal at the Olympics and the world bronze at the 2007 Osaka World Championships with the 4 × 100 m relay and the other daughter Alizia (born 1991) was also a decent sprinter. The four sons are all 400 m specialists, the twins Jonathan and Kevin (born 1988), both Olympic finalists in London 2012, Dylan (born 1992) and the youngest Rayane. In addition, Jacques' older brother  (born 1947) was also a sprinter.

In 2015 the Belgian men's 4 × 400 meters relay team won the Belgian National Sports Merit Award (Trophée national du Mérite sportif) award assigned to the components Dylan Borlée, Jonathan Borlée, Kevin Borlée, Antoine Gillet et Julien Watrin.

Results

Olympic Games

Others competitions
Outdoor

Indoor

See also
 Belgium at the World Athletics Relays
 Royal Belgian Athletics League
 Borlée family
 Italian national track relay team

Notes

References

External links
 Royal Belgian Athletics League

National sports teams of Belgium